J.C. Lodge, (born June Carol Lodge, 1 December 1958, London, England), is a British-Jamaican reggae singer, actress, fine artist and teacher. Her breakthrough hit "Someone Loves You, Honey" became the best-selling single of 1982 in the Netherlands. Lodge is also an accomplished painter, having exhibited in Kingston art galleries, and has acted in several theatre productions.

Music career
British born to a Jamaican father and British mother, J.C. Lodge was taken to Jamaica as a child. There, the Beatles fan soon became immersed in R&B and reggae, and sang along to everything she heard.

Toward the end of high school, a relationship with Errol O'Meally led her further along her music path. He was a budding songwriter, and used her voice to present some of his material to Joe Gibbs' Recording Studio. Both the songs and the singer were well received, and J.C. was asked to record Charley Pride's hit "Someone Loves You, Honey" in 1980. The reggae version of the country and western tune topped the Jamaican charts, and earned the singer gold and platinum discs in the Netherlands. In fact, it was the No. 1 top-selling single of 1982 over there. While the record was a big hit, it bankrupted Gibbs as he had failed to pay royalties to the songwriter. An album of the same name, featuring the deejay talents of Prince Mohamed was released in 1982.

Lodge followed this with 1985's Revealed album, before signing to Gussie Clarke's Music Works label, and releasing I Believe in You and Selfish Lover albums. "Telephone Love", recorded for Clarke in 1988, was the first dancehall reggae track to cross over in the R&B and hip-hop markets in the United States, topping the urban charts in New York City and other cities, and earning her a deal with the Warner Bros.-owned Tommy Boy label, although the association would be limited to the Tropic of Love album and "Home is Where the Hurt Is" single, which gave her her highest US chart placing, reaching number 45 in the R&B chart.

Lodge's albums mostly consisted of reggae, but some with R&B and pop material, too, usually written by O’Meally or J.C.. Producers like Joe Gibbs, Willie Lindo, Gussie Clarke, Errol O’Meally and Neil Fraser (a.k.a. Mad Professor), created product which garnered for J.C. several hits and prestigious awards across the world.

Lodge's other songs also include "More Than I Can Say" and "Make It Up." She sang a duet with Tiger on "Love Me, Baby" and with Shabba Ranks on "Telephone Love."

In 2001, she returned to her native England, and recorded Reggae Country for Jet Star, an album of covers of American country songs. She studied for a teaching degree and combined work as a schoolteacher with her music career.

Sing 'n' Learn 
J.C. Lodge has been inspired since the birth of her daughter in 1994, to write original children's songs. She released two cassette albums called "Sing 'n' Learn". Ranging from simple counting and spelling for the littlest ones to manners and environmental awareness for pre-teens, Lodge created a variety of rhythms and styles to appeal to kids everywhere. These cassettes were so well received in Jamaica that the Ministry of Education ordered a copy for every Basic School on the island.

In 2000, Lodge was invited by Jamaican National Broadcasting Association TVJ to produce a 13-part children's television series, based on the cassette albums. A critically acclaimed and popular success, the show got awarded by the Press Association of Jamaica and also the Caribbean Broadcasting Union.

Discography

Albums
 Someone Loves You Honey (1982) (Netherlands No. 5) Ariola/BMG Records
 Revealed (1985) RAS
 I Believe in You (1987) Greensleeves
 Selfish Lover (1990) VP
 Home is Where The Hurt Is (1991)
 Tropic of Love (1992) Tommy Boy/Warner Bros. Records
 To the Max (1993) RAS/Sanctuary
 Special Request (1995) RAS/Sanctuary
 Love for All Seasons (1996) Ariwa
 RAS Portraits: J.C. Lodge (1997) RAS/Sanctuary (compilation)
 Let Love Inside (2001) Mercury/IDJMG/Universal Records
 Reggae Country (2002) Jet Star
 Reggae Country 2 (2003) Jet Star
 This Is Crucial Reggae (2004) RAS/Sanctuary (compilation)
 Storybook revisited - Telephone Love (2021)

Singles (selection)
 "Someone Loves You Honey" (1982) (Belgium No. 1 / Germany No. 25 / Netherlands No. 1 / Netherlands No. 1 end of the year chart) 
 "More Than I Can Say" (1982) (Belgium No. 10 / Germany No. 72 / Netherlands No. 6)
 "Don't Stop Me" (1982) 
 "Kiss and Say Goodbye" (1984) 
 "Give My Husband a Message" (1985) 
 "Telephone Love" (1988) (USA R&B No. 95) – Shabba Ranks featuring J.C. Lodge
 "Home Is Where the Hurt Is" (1991) (USA R&B No. 45)
 "Come Again" (1992)
 "Love Transfusion" (2012)
 "Comfort Zone" (2013)

References

External links
 
 Dutch Top 100 – End of Year List 1982
 official website Sing 'n' Learn
 J.C. Lodge at Discogs
 June Lodge at Discogs

1958 births
Living people
20th-century Black British women singers
British reggae musicians
20th-century Jamaican women singers
Jamaican reggae singers
Tommy Boy Records artists
Mercury Records artists
21st-century Black British women singers
VP Records artists
Greensleeves Records artists